Nahsukin Lake is located in Glacier National Park, in the U. S. state of Montana. Nahsukin Lake is southeast of Nahsukin Mountain.

"Nahsukin" is a Kootenai word for chief.

See also
List of lakes in Glacier County, Montana

References

Lakes of Glacier National Park (U.S.)
Lakes of Glacier County, Montana